Fazlabad (also Romanized as Faẕlābād) is a village in Kuh Hamayi Rural District, Rud Ab District, Sabzevar County, Razavi Khorasan Province, Iran. As of the 2006 census, its population was 63, with 20 families in the village.

References 

Populated places in Sabzevar County